Polillo, officially the Municipality of Polillo,  is a 3rd class municipality in the province of Quezon, Philippines. According to the 2020 census, it has a population of 31,908 people.

It is located on the southern part of the eponymous Polillo Island fronting the Philippine Sea and its jurisdiction also includes Balesin Island in Lamon Bay.

History

Trade relations between the natives of the Polillo Islands and Chinese merchants existed long before the Spanish conquerors came to the archipelago. Trade was a conglomeration of Malay-Hindu-Chinese-Tagalog.

Padre Morga wrote that Polillo originated from the Chinese word "Pulilu", which means beautiful island with plenty of food, it was home to native a barangay-state which was also known as Pulilu and recorded as such in Chinese chronicles, it was mentioned as politically connected to the nation of Sandao, itself a vassal state to the nation of Ma-i. When Juan de Salcedo, a Spanish conqueror came to Polillo in 1567, he saw a central government fully organized through the Balangay, with a datu who had a direct supervision and control over all the natives. The inhabitants lived in nipa huts.

In 1571 the Spaniards took hold of the islands of Pu Li Lu. Through the leadership of Padre Domingo, a Spanish friar, a chapel was built, where the old Spanish church was later constructed. After one and a half years, the people, through forced labor built a concrete wall to protect the "pueblo" of Pu Li Lu from moro pirate invaders. Watchtowers called "castillos" were erected in the four corners of the pueblo.

The church was constructed in 1577 . Boulders, gravel and sand were mixed with lime produced out of seashells and coral stones. Padre Domingo instigated the planting of sugar cane in San Isidro, San Antonio and San Francisco. Production of molasses was put into full swing.

Spanish conquistadores were assigned to the "pueblo" of Pu Li Lu to promote church construction. The church tower was constructed with priority, so that in 1587, in the early summer of May, two huge bronze bells rang atop. Due to language problems, Padre Domingo changed Pu Li Lu to Polillo.

In 1942, the occupied by the Japanese Imperial forces landed in Polillo.

In 1945, the liberation by the Philippine Commonwealth troops of the 5th and 52nd Infantry Division of the Philippine Commonwealth Army landed in Polillo we fought the battles against the Japanese forces in the Battle of Polillo Island during World War II.

In 1987, three weeks before the April 18 coup attempt against the national government, cadres of the New People's Army attacked the Philippine Constabulary detachment in Polillo Island. 

In recent years, government-funded infrastructures were built and private investments in hotel, resorts, services and utilities increased.

A notable personality, Rafael "Raffy" Puchero Nantes - a former three-termer 1st District Congressman of Quezon (1998–2001, 2001–2004, 2004–2007) and Governor of Quezon Province (2007–2010). Governor Raffy P. Nantes, fondly called as "Kuya Raffy", died in a helicopter accident that crashed into two houses at Hael Subdivision 1, Barangay Iyam, Lucena City on Monday, May 17, 2010,  about 3:15 p.m. He had just attended a regular weekly flag raising ceremony at Quezon Convention Center in Kapitolyo, Lucena City, Quezon, Philippines.

On 26 March 2021, two NPA members surrendered to government forces in Barangay Salipsip. 

On 21 February 2022, the Armed Forces of the Philippines fought an armed encounter with the New People's Army in Barangay Binitbitinan. The NPA eventually withdrew.

Geography
It is bounded by municipality of Panukulan in the northwest and the municipality of Burdeos in the northeastern side of the island. Lamon Bay bounds it at the south, east and west. It can be reached by motorboats more or less three hours via Real-Polillo in the Ungos Port and a little bit shorter via, Infanta-Polillo through Infanta Municipal Fish Port.

Barangays
Polillo is politically subdivided into 20 barangays.

 Anawan
 Atulayan
 Balesin
 Bañadero
 Binibitinan
 Bislian
 Bucao
 Canicanian
 Kalubakis
 Languyin
 Libjo
 Pamatdan
 Pilion
 Pinaglubayan
 Poblacion
 Sabang
 Salipsip
 Sibulan
 Taluong
 Tamulaya-Anibong

Climate

Demographics

Economy

Festivities

The town of Polillo is celebrating its founding anniversary every March 18 more than 400 years ago. The celebration last for at least three days. Starting from March 17, there are different celebrations held in the town proper including the "Gabi ng Parangal" (Coronation Night) of the Town's Beauty, Binibining Polillo and all the ladies representing different barangays.

March 18 is the most awaited day of the celebration where a big parade can be seen by all the natives and guest. The "Parada" includes all the schools, NGOs, LGUs, all the barangay participants and more. The most awaited groups in the parade are the "Banda" - School Bands - from different schools and school levels. Celebration will continue until night fall with the "Sayawan" at the town plaza.

March 19 is the Feast of St. Joseph. the Patron Saint of the town. The celebration starts from a procession together with all the patron saints of all the sitios and barangays and all devotees of Saint Joseph. Including all the sitio's and barangay's patron saints in the procession is known as "dapit". Many believes that this celebration of the Feast of Saint Joseph plays big part from the town's safety against nature disaster specially typhoons. It has something to do with the church history where those saints served as protector along the region. Devotees of St. Joseph now turns the old "St. Joseph Parish" into "Prelature Shrine of St. Joseph" as ordered by the Bishop of Infanta, Bp. Rolando J. Tria Tirona, OCD. DD. year 2010 under the leadership of Fr. Noe Ramos, former Parish Priest of the Town.

Travel
Getting to Polillo from Manila takes around six hours of travel by land and by sea. The first segment of the trip involves travelling to Ungos Port in Real, Quezon via the Pililla-Famy-Real road. The recently opened Marcos Highway(Marikina-Infanta Highway) is also another route to Ungos Port. Raymond Bus with its terminal located in Legarda, Manila, has regular scheduled trips to Real, Quezon.

There are two regular boat trips from Real to Polillo. The first trip usually leaves at 7:30 AM as the bus passengers coming from Lucena and Manila try to catch it up. The next boat leaves at 10:00 AM. The boats are outrigger types powered with a surplus truck engine. The return trips from Polillo are at 5:00 AM and 1:00 PM. The trip from Ungos Port to Polillo usually takes three hours.

There are passenger ferries that depart from Dinahican Port in Infanta to Barangay Macnit in Polillo.

There are also boat trips to Balesin Island and Polillo from Atimonan's port.

See also
Polillo Islands

References

External links
Polillo Profile at PhilAtlas.com
[ Philippine Standard Geographic Code]
Philippine Census Information
Local Governance Performance Management System
Quezon Province Community and Web Portal

Municipalities of Quezon